Sohrab Moradi (born 22 September 1988) is an Iranian weightlifter who won the gold medal in the 94 kg weight division at the 2016 Olympics. He was the Asian champion in the 85 kg class in 2009 and 2012. 

He was banned from the sport for two years for doping, after testing positive for methadone.

Major results

References

External links

Profile

1988 births
Living people
Iranian male weightlifters
Iranian strength athletes
Olympic weightlifters of Iran
Weightlifters at the 2012 Summer Olympics
Weightlifters at the 2016 Summer Olympics
Iranian sportspeople in doping cases
Doping cases in weightlifting
Medalists at the 2016 Summer Olympics
Olympic gold medalists for Iran
Olympic medalists in weightlifting
World Weightlifting Championships medalists
Asian Games medalists in weightlifting
Asian Games gold medalists for Iran
Weightlifters at the 2018 Asian Games
Medalists at the 2018 Asian Games
20th-century Iranian people
21st-century Iranian people